Owen Holland may refer to:

 Owen Holland (academic), professor of cognitive robotics
 Owen Holland (MP) (died 1601), Welsh politician